Peptidase inhibitor 16 is a protein that in humans is encoded by the PI16 gene.

References

Further reading